John Van Vechten House is a historic home located at Leeds in Greene County, New York.  It was built in 1891 and is a masonry, -story Queen Anne–style dwelling with rectangular massing on a stone foundation.  It features large gable wall dormers and a hipped roof with standing seam metal roofing.

It was listed on the National Register of Historic Places in 1995.

References

Houses on the National Register of Historic Places in New York (state)
Queen Anne architecture in New York (state)
Houses completed in 1891
Houses in Greene County, New York
National Register of Historic Places in Greene County, New York